Radio Hargeisa  is a Somaliland public service broadcaster, Its headquarters are at Ministry of Information, Hargeisa.

History
Established in 1943 in the former British Somaliland protectorate as the first Somali language station, it broadcasts mostly in Somali but also features news bulletins in Amharic, Arabic and English. The channel was responsible for the widespread propagation of the new Balwo genre developed by Abdi Sinimo and the Heellooy oud music that Abdullahi Qarshe fused Balwo with.

See also

Media of Somaliland
Ministry of Information and National Guidance (Somaliland)
Dawan (newspaper)
Somaliland National TV
Somali music
Abdullahi Qarshe
Abdi Sinimo
Ali Feiruz

References

Radio stations in Somaliland
Somali-language radio stations
Hargeisa
1943 establishments in Africa
Radio stations established in 1943